The Distinguished Order of the Golden Fleece is a Catholic order of chivalry founded in Bruges by Philip the Good, Duke of Burgundy, in 1430, to celebrate his marriage to Isabella of Portugal. Today, two branches of the order exist, namely the Spanish and the Austrian Fleece; the current grand masters are Felipe VI, King of Spain and Karl von Habsburg, head of the House of Habsburg-Lorraine, respectively. The Grand Chaplain of the Austrian branch is Cardinal Christoph Schönborn, Archbishop of Vienna.

The separation of the two existing branches took place as a result of the War of the Spanish Succession. The grand master of the order, Charles II of Spain (a Habsburg), had died childless in 1700, and so the succession to the throne of Spain and the Golden Fleece initiated a global conflict. On one hand, Charles, brother of the Holy Roman Emperor, claimed the crown as an agnatic member of the House of Habsburg, which had held the throne for almost two centuries. However, the late king had named Philip of Bourbon, his sister's grandchild, as his successor in his will. After the conclusion of the war in 1714, Philip was recognized as King of Spain, but the hitherto Spanish Netherlands, the old Burgundian territories, fell to the Austrian Habsburgs. Thus the two dynasties, namely the Bourbons of Spain and the Habsburgs of Austria, have ever since continued granting the separate versions of the Golden Fleece.

The Golden Fleece has been referred to as the most prestigious and historic order of chivalry in the world. De Bourgoing wrote in 1789 that "the number of knights of the Golden Fleece is very limited in Spain, and this is the order, which of all those in Europe, has best preserved its ancient splendour". Each collar is solid gold and is estimated to be worth around €50,000 as of 2018, making it the most expensive chivalrous order. Current knights of the order include Emperor Akihito of Japan, former Tsar Simeon of Bulgaria, and Queen Beatrix of the Netherlands, amongst 13 others. Knights of the Austrian branch include 33 noblemen and princes of small territories in Central Europe, most of them of German or Austrian origin.

Origin
The Order of the Golden Fleece was established on 10 January 1430, by Philip the Good, Duke of Burgundy (on the occasion of his wedding to Isabella of Portugal), in celebration of the prosperous and wealthy domains united in his person that ran from Flanders to Switzerland. The jester and dwarf Madame d'Or performed at the creation of the order of the Golden Fleece in Bruges. It is restricted to a limited number of knights, initially 24 but increased to 30 in 1433, and 50 in 1516, plus the sovereign. The order's first king of arms was Jean Le Fèvre de Saint-Remy. It received further privileges unusual to any order of knighthood: the sovereign undertook to consult the order before going to war; all disputes between the knights were to be settled by the order; at each chapter the deeds of each knight were held in review, and punishments and admonitions were dealt out to offenders, and to this the sovereign was expressly subject; the knights could claim as of right to be tried by their fellows on charges of rebellion, heresy and treason, and Charles V conferred on the order exclusive jurisdiction over all crimes committed by the knights; the arrest of the offender had to be by warrant signed by at least six knights, and during the process of charge and trial he remained not in prison but in the gentle custody of his fellow knights.  The order, conceived in an ecclesiastical spirit in which mass and obsequies were prominent and the knights were seated in choirstalls like canons, was explicitly denied to heretics, and so became an exclusively Catholic honour during the Reformation.  The officers of the order were the chancellor, the treasurer, the registrar, and the king of arms (herald).

The Duke's stated reason for founding this institution had been given in a proclamation issued following his marriage, in which he wrote that he had done so "for the reverence of God and the maintenance of our Christian Faith, and to honor and exalt the noble order of knighthood, and also ... to do honor to old knights; ... so that those who are at present still capable and strong of body and do each day the deeds pertaining to chivalry shall have cause to continue from good to better; and ... so that those knights and gentlemen who shall see worn the order ... should honor those who wear it, and be encouraged to employ themselves in noble deeds ...".

The Order of the Golden Fleece was defended from possible accusations of prideful pomp by the Burgundian court poet Michault Taillevent, who asserted that it was instituted:

Translated into English:

The choice of the Golden Fleece of Colchis as the symbol of a Christian order caused some controversy, not so much because of its pagan context, which could be incorporated in chivalric ideals, as in the Nine Worthies, but because the feats of Jason, familiar to all, were not without causes of reproach, expressed in anti-Burgundian terms by Alain Chartier in his Ballade de Fougères referring to Jason as "Who, to carry off the fleece of Colchis, was willing to commit perjury." The bishop of Châlons, chancellor of the order, identified it instead with the fleece of Gideon that received the dew of Heaven.

The badge of the order, in the form of a sheepskin, was suspended from a jewelled collar of firesteels in the shape of the letter B, for Burgundy, linked by flints; with the motto  ('No Mean Reward for Labours') engraved on the front of the central link, and Philip's motto  ('I will have no other') on the back (non-royal knights of the Golden Fleece were forbidden to belong to any other order of knighthood).

During this time, the Burgundian court was culturally leading in Europe and so the new order, with its festivals, ceremonies, rituals and constitution, was seen by many as a role model in the sense of a princely order based on the ideals of Christian chivalry. Aid to the Byzantine Empire or the pushing back of the Ottomans was repeatedly promoted by the Burgundian dukes in connection with their order. The Burgundian fleet actually crossed Rhodes and the Black Sea, but all of the ideas came from an extended planning phase that was not yet complete.
After the death of Charles the Bold in an attempt to conquer the Duchy of Lorraine caused the extinction of the House of Burgundy in 1477, the order passed to the House of Habsburg. A few months after his marriage to the heiress Mary of Burgundy, Emperor Maximilian of Habsburg was knighted in Bruges on April 30, 1478, and then appointed sovereign (grand master) of the order. All renegade or disloyal knights of the order in the course of the subsequent War of the Burgundian Succession were expelled from the order by Maximilian. The memory of the dead was erased and their coats of arms were broken.

From Emperor Charles V or King Philip II of Spain, the sovereign was on the one hand the head of the Spanish line of the Habsburgs and on the other hand also king of Spain. Charles V was appointed head of the order at the age of 9 and identified himself strongly with this community throughout his life. The ideal of chivalrous and brave living was brought to him by William de Croÿ. When in 1700 Charles II of Spain died childless, both the Habsburgs from the Habsburg lands and the Bourbons, as the new kings of Spain, claimed sovereignty of the order. Both noble houses basically invoked their claims regarding the Spanish crown. The House of Habsburg's claim relied on Article 65 of the Statutes. Holy Roman Emperor Charles VI was able to claim sovereignty of the Netherlands, the Burgundian heartland, during the War of the Spanish Succession and thus he could celebrate the order's festival in Vienna in 1713. As with Maximilian I or Charles V, the order was again closely associated with the Holy Roman Empire.
Regardless of this, the order was divided into two lines. The Habsburg order owns the archive and the old insignia and adheres more to the original statutes.

Spanish order

With the absorption of the Burgundian lands into the Spanish Habsburg empire, the sovereignty of the order passed to the Habsburg kings of Spain, where it remained until the death of the last of the Spanish Habsburgs, Charles II, in 1700. He was succeeded as king by Philip V, a Bourbon. The dispute between Philip and the Habsburg pretender to the Spanish throne, the Archduke Charles, led to the War of the Spanish Succession, and also resulted in the division of the order into Spanish and Austrian branches. In either case the sovereign, as Duke of Burgundy, writes the letter of appointment in French.

The controversial conferral of the Fleece on Napoleon and his brother Joseph, while Spain was occupied by French troops, angered the exiled king of France, Louis XVIII, and caused him to return his collar in protest. These, and other awards by Joseph, were revoked by King Ferdinand on the restoration of Bourbon rule in 1813. Napoleon created by Order of 15 August 1809 the Order of the Three Golden Fleeces, in view of his sovereignty over Austria, Spain and Burgundy. This was opposed by Joseph I of Spain and appointments to the new order were never made.

In 1812, the acting government of Spain conferred the Fleece upon the Duke of Wellington, an act confirmed by Ferdinand on his resumption of power, with the approval of Pope Pius VII. Wellington therefore became the first Protestant to be honoured with the Golden Fleece. It has subsequently also been conferred upon non-Christians, such as Bhumibol Adulyadej, King of Thailand.

There was another crisis in 1833 when Isabella II became Queen of Spain in defiance of Salic Law that did not allow women to become heads of state. Her right to confer the Fleece was challenged by Spanish Carlists.

Sovereignty remained with the head of the Spanish House of Bourbon during the republican (1931–1939) and Francoist (1939–1975) periods, and is held today by the present king of Spain, Felipe VI. There is confusion towards the conferral of the Fleece on Francisco Franco in 1972. The order was illegally offered by Infante Jaime to him on the occasion of his son's wedding to the dictator's granddaughter, Carmen. Franco kindly refused the order on the basis of legitimacy and primogeniture, stating that the Golden Fleece could only be granted by the reigning king of Spain. Moreover, the right of conferral was in any case a prerogative of Jaime's younger brother, Infante Juan, as designated heir to the throne of Spain by his father Alfonso XIII.

Knights of the order are entitled to be addressed with the style His/Her Excellency in front of their name.

Grand Masters of the Order
Charles I (1516–1556)
Philip II (1556–1598)
Philip III (1598–1621)
Philip IV (1621–1665)
Charles II (1665–1700)
Philip V (1700–1724)
Louis I (1724–1724)
Philip V (1724–1746)
Ferdinand VI (1746–1759)
Charles III (1759–1788)
Charles IV (1788–1808)
Ferdinand VII (1808–1833)
Isabella II (1833–1870)
Amadeo I (1870–1873)
Alfonso XII (1874–1885)
Alfonso XIII (1886–1941)
Juan, Count of Barcelona (1941–1977)
Juan Carlos I (1977–2014)
Felipe VI (2014–present)

Living members
Below a list of the names of the living knights and ladies, in chronologic order and, within parentheses, the year when they were inducted into the order:

 Felipe VI of Spain (1981) – as reigning king of Spain, sovereign of the order since 2014 after his father abdicated his rights to him.
 Juan Carlos I of Spain (1941) – former sovereign of the order as king of Spain from 1975 to 2014.
 Carl XVI Gustaf of Sweden (1983)
 Akihito, Emperor Emeritus of Japan (1985)
 Beatrix, Princess of the Netherlands (1985)
 Margrethe II of Denmark (1985)
 Albert II of Belgium (1994)
 Harald V of Norway (1995)
 Simeon Saxe-Coburg-Gotha (2004), former Tsar Simeon II of Bulgaria, and former prime minister of the Republic of Bulgaria, 2001–2005 
 Henri, Grand Duke of Luxembourg (2007)
 Javier Solana (2010)
 Víctor García de la Concha (2010)
 Nicolas Sarkozy, Co-Prince of Andorra (2011) and former president of the French Republic 2007–2012 
 Enrique V. Iglesias (2014)
 Leonor, Princess of Asturias (2015, presented 2018)

Armorial of the Spanish Golden Fleece

Austrian (Habsburg) order

The Austrian order did not suffer from the political difficulties of the Spanish, remaining (with the exception of the British prince regent, later George IV) an honour solely for Catholic royalty and nobility. The problem of female inheritance was avoided on the accession of Maria Theresa in 1740, as sovereignty of the order passed not to herself but to her husband, Francis.

The entire treasure of the order, which also includes the "Ainkhürn sword" of the last duke of Burgundy and the centuries-old oath cross, which contains a cross splinter of the True Cross, is located in the Vienna Treasury and, like the archive and the old insignia, is the property of the Habsburg branch.

Upon the collapse of the Austrian monarchy after the First World War, King Albert I of Belgium requested that the sovereignty and treasure of the order be transferred to him as the ruler of the former Habsburg lands of Burgundy. This claim was seriously considered by the victorious Allies at Versailles but was eventually rejected due to the intervention of King Alfonso XIII of Spain, who took possession of the property of the order on behalf of the dethroned emperor, Charles I of Austria.

Nazi Germany classified the order as hostile to the state and tried to confiscate the entire treasure of the order including the archive. Hitler categorically rejected the centuries-old Habsburg principles of "live and let live" in relation to ethnic groups, peoples, minorities, religions, cultures and languages, and also wanted to seize significant works of art that are unique worldwide. Hitler intended to decide on the use of the assets after they had been confiscated. After the annexation of Austria in 1938, Max von Hohenberg, Habsburg representative in the affairs of the order, was immediately sent to a concentration camp.

After the Second World War in 1953, the Republic of Austria continued to confirm to the House of Habsburg the right to the Order on its territory, in particular that the Order has its own legal personality. As a result, the order itself remains the owner of the treasure and the archive. The historically and artistically extremely valuable treasure from the early days of the order includes the oath cross from 1401/02, the golden collar of office for the herald (1517), collars of the order (approx. 1560), vestments and historical relics.

Sovereignty of the Austrian branch remains with the head of the House of Habsburg, which was handed over on 20 November 2000 by Otto von Habsburg to his elder son, Karl von Habsburg.

November 30 (feast day of St. Andrew the Apostle, patron saint of Burgundy) is the day of the order, when new members are accepted into the order. The extremely valuable treasures are in the Vienna Treasury and in the Austrian State Archives. To date, the new knights and officers take the oath in front of the so-called "oath cross", which is kept in the treasury in Vienna. It is a simply designed golden cross set with precious stones (sapphires, rubies and pearls). In the central part of the cross there is a splinter of the Holy Cross, which makes it a relic cross.

Grand Masters of the Order
 Emperor Charles VI (1711–1740)
 Emperor Francis I (1740–1765)
 Emperor Joseph II (1765–1790)
 Emperor Leopold II (1790–1792)
 Emperor Francis II (1792–1835)
 Emperor Ferdinand I (1835–1848)
 Emperor Franz Joseph I (1848–1916)
 Emperor Charles I (1916–1922)
 Archduke Otto von Habsburg (1922–2011)
 Archduke Karl von Habsburg (2011–present)

Living members
Below a list of the names of the living knights, in chronological order, followed in parentheses by the date, when known, of their induction into the order:

 Franz, Duke of Bavaria (1960)
 Archduke Karl of Austria (1961) – sovereign (grand master) of the order since 2000
 Archduke Andreas Salvator of Austria, Prince of Tuscany
 Archduke Carl Salvator of Austria, Prince of Tuscany
 Prince Lorenz of Belgium, Archduke of Austria-Este
 Archduke Michael of Austria
 Archduke Michael Salvator of Austria, Prince of Tuscany 
 Archduke Georg of Austria
 Archduke Carl Christian of Austria
 King Albert II of Belgium
 Hans-Adam II, Prince of Liechtenstein
 Duarte Pio, Duke of Braganza
 Karl, Prince of Schwarzenberg (1991) 
 Archduke Joseph of Austria (born 1960)
 The Prince of Löwenstein-Wertheim-Rosenberg
 Mariano Hugo, Prince of Windisch-Graetz
 Baron Johann Friedrich of Solemacher-Antweiler
 Kubrat, Prince of Panagyurishte (2002)
 Philippe of Belgium (2008)
 Michel, Prince of Ligne (2011)
 Prince Charles-Louis de Merode (2011)
 Archduke Ferdinand Zvonimir of Austria
 Alexander, Margrave of Meissen (2012)

Officials
 Chancellor: Count Alexander von Pachta-Reyhofen (since 2005) 
 Grand chaplain: Christoph Cardinal Schönborn, Archbishop of Vienna (since 1992)
 Chaplain:  (since 2007)
 Treasurer: Baron Wulf Gordian von Hauser (since 1992)
 Registrar: Count Karl-Philipp von Clam-Martinic (since 2007)
 Herald: Count Karl-Albrecht von Waldstein-Wartenberg (since 1997)

Chapters of the order

Source: Livre du toison d'or, online, fols. 4r-66r

Insignia

See also
List of Knights of the Golden Fleece

References

Literature
 Weltliche und Geistliche Schatzkammer. Bildführer. Kunsthistorischen Museum, Vienna. 1987. 
 Fillitz, Hermann. Die Schatzkammer in Wien: Symbole abendländischen Kaisertums. Vienna, 1986. 
 Fillitz, Hermann. Der Schatz des Ordens vom Goldenen Vlies. Vienna, 1988. 
 Boulton, D'Arcy Jonathan Dacre, 1987. The Knights of The Crown: The Monarchical Orders of Knighthood in Later Medieval Europe, 1325–1520, Woodbridge, Suffolk (Boydell Press),（revised edition 2000）

External links

The Society of the golden fleece, an association of people interested in the order
The Most Illustrious Order of the Golden Fleece at a reference site on chivalric orders.

 
1430 establishments in Europe
1430s establishments in the Holy Roman Empire
 1